The Gloucester Township Public Schools is a community public school district serving students in pre-kindergarten through eighth grade from Gloucester Township, in Camden County, New Jersey, United States. The district operates eight PreK/K-5 elementary schools and three grade 6-8 middle schools, including the Ann A. Mullen Middle School, dedicated in September 1996 and named in honor of former mayor Ann A. Mullen. The district describes itself as the state's largest elementary school district.

As of the 2020–21 school year, the district, comprised of 11 schools, had an enrollment of 6,481 students and 534.3 classroom teachers (on an FTE basis), for a student–teacher ratio of 12.1:1.

The district is classified by the New Jersey Department of Education as being in District Factor Group "DE", the fifth-highest of eight groupings. District Factor Groups organize districts statewide to allow comparison by common socioeconomic characteristics of the local districts. From lowest socioeconomic status to highest, the categories are A, B, CD, DE, FG, GH, I and J.

Students in public school for ninth through twelfth grades attend one of the three high schools that are part of the Black Horse Pike Regional School District. The schools in the district (with 2020–21 enrollment data from the National Center for Education Statistics) are 
Highland Regional High School (1,188 students; located in Blackwood), 
Timber Creek Regional High School (1,187; Erial) or 
Triton Regional High School (1,103; Runnemede). Students from Gloucester Township attend one of the three schools based on their residence address; students from Bellmawr and Runnemede, the other two communities in the district, all attend Triton High School.

Schools
Schools in the district (with 2020–21 enrollment data from the National Center for Education Statistics) are:
Elementary schools
Blackwood Elementary School (581 students; in grades PreK-5)
Alexander Ferrante, Principal
Chews Elementary School (662; PreK-5)
LaWayne Williams, Principal
Erial Elementary School (650; PreK-5)
Maria McKeown, Principal
Glendora Elementary School (232; K-5)
Patrick McCarthy, Principal
Gloucester Township Elementary School (252; K-5)
Joseph Gentile, Principal
James W. Lilley Jr. Elementary School (494; K-5)
Angela Rose-Bounds, Principal 
Loring-Flemming Elementary School (651; K-5)
Aaron J. Rose, Principal
Union Valley Elementary School (476; K-5)
Tracy J. Elwell, Principal
Middle schools
Glen Landing Middle School (657; 6-8)
Takisha Jones, Principal
Charles W. Lewis Middle School (657; 6-8)
Theodore Otten, Principal
Ann A. Mullen Middle School (919; 6-8)
Roselyn Feliciano, Principal

Administration
Core members of the district's administration are:
John D. Bilodeau, Superintendent
Janice Grassia, Business Administrator / Board Secretary

Board of education
The district's board of education, comprised of nine members, sets policy and oversees the fiscal and educational operation of the district through its administration. As a Type II school district, the board's trustees are elected directly by voters to serve three-year terms of office on a staggered basis, with three seats up for election each year held (since 2012) as part of the November general election. The board appoints a superintendent to oversee the district's day-to-day operations and a business administrator to supervise the business functions of the district.

References

External links
Gloucester Township Public Schools

School Data for the Gloucester Township Public Schools, National Center for Education Statistics
Black Horse Pike Regional School District

Gloucester Township, New Jersey
New Jersey District Factor Group DE
School districts in Camden County, New Jersey